Hilversum Airfield  is a general aviation aerodrome  south-southwest of Hilversum, a municipality and town in the Gooi region and the province of North Holland in the Netherlands. The airfield is used for general aviation including gliding and for parachuting.

The majority of flights are with smaller single engine piston aircraft, either for training or recreational purposes. There have been rumours of a hard runway, but as of 2020 no concrete plans have been announced.

Though founded in 1939 with civil aviation in mind, because of the unrest in Europe, the Royal Netherlands Air Force took control of the airfield, using it as a base for Fokker C-5, Fokker C-10 and Koolhoven F.K.51 aircraft. On the 10 and 11 May 1940, the airport came under heavy attack by Luftwaffe Messerschmitt Bf 109 aircraft. After Germany occupied the Netherlands later that month, they expanded the airport significantly for further military use.

As it became clear that the field was going to be lost to allied forces, German military destroyed most of the field, to prevent use by the allied forces. After the war, the airport remained under military control briefly, but reopened to civil traffic again in 1948.

References

External links
 Hilversum Airport, official website
 Photos taken at Hilversum Airport (EHHV) from Airliners.net

Airports established in 1939
Airports in North Holland
Hilversum